The Toronto Symphony Youth Orchestra (TSYO) is a high-level orchestral training programme for musicians aged 22 and under, based in Toronto, Ontario, Canada. TSYO alumni are found in most major performing organizations in Canada, and many have embarked on solo and chamber music careers worldwide. The TSYO is led by the TSO's RBC Resident Conductor, Simon Rivard, and coached by TSO musicians Shane Kim (Violin), Peter Seminovs (Violin), Theresa Rudolph (Viola), Joseph Johnson (Cello), Paul Rogers (Double Bass), Miles Jaques (Woodwinds), Nicholas Hartman (Brass), and Joseph Kelly (Percussion). Previous conductors include Alain Trudel, who conducted the orchestra from 2004 to 2012, and Shalom Bard.

Founded in 1974 by Victor Feldbrill, the TSYO has had a close partnership with the Toronto Symphony Orchestra for over 30 years. A collaborative on-stage performance named "Side-by-Side" is held annually at Roy Thomson Hall. Additionally, all TSYO members are encouraged to compete in an annual concerto competition. The prize of this competition is the opportunity to perform a solo with the Toronto Symphony Orchestra.

Through their affiliation with the Toronto Symphony Orchestra, the TYSO has worked with world-renowned guest artists and conductors. Recent guests include: Henning Kraggerud, Vadim Gluzman, James Ehnes, Colin Carr, Pinchas Zukerman, Nadja Salerno-Sonnenberg, Pekka Kuusisto, Yo-Yo Ma, Richard Stolzman, Wynton Marsalis, Christian Lindberg, Colin Currie, Jukka-Pekka Saraste, Gunther Herbig, Maxim Vengerov, Sir Andrew Davis, and TSO Music Director Peter Oundjian to name only a few.

The group has toured extensively within Canada and abroad. In 1999, the TSYO represented Canada at the Banff International Festival of Youth Orchestras. Other destinations include Quebec, Texas, Massachusetts, California, Japan and Europe. In May 2012, the TSYO traveled to British Columbia with performances in Vancouver, Nanaimo and Victoria.

History 
In June 1974, a proposal by Board member John McDougall for a youth orchestra under the Toronto Symphony received funding and unanimous support from the Toronto Symphony Board. During its first season, Victor Feldbrill was chosen as the first Music Director of the TSYO. On February 2, 1975, the inaugural concert of the TSYO was performed in the MacMillan Theatre at the University of Toronto.

In the summer of 1985, the TSYO toured in Europe. The orchestra performed in the Netherlands, England, and Scotland; the tour began at the International Festival of Youth Orchestras in Aberdeen, Scotland. The tour ended at the London Youth Festival, where the TSYO was the only non-British youth orchestra invited to the festival. The tour was planned to coincide with the United Nations' International Year of Youth.

List of Conductors 

 Victor Feldbrill (1974-1978, 2003-2004)
 Leonard Atherton (1978-1979)
 Ermanno Florio & David Zafer (1979-1986)
 Nurham Arman (1986-1987)
 Joaquin Valdepeñas & David Zafer (1987-1999)
 Bramwell Tovey (1999-2000)
 Susan Haig (2000-2003)
 Alain Trudel (2004-2012)
 Shalom Bard* (2012-2016)
 Earl Lee* (2016-2018)
 Simon Rivard (2018-)

*Denotes TSYO alumni.

See also 
 List of youth orchestras

References

External links
 TSYO information at the Toronto Symphony Orchestra's site
 blog
 Begins with the Oboe: A History of the Toronto Symphony Orchestra from the University of Toronto Press

Musical groups established in 1974
Musical groups from Toronto
Youth orchestras
Canadian orchestras